No Kidding may refer to:

 No Kidding (film), a 1960 British comedy film
 No Kidding!, an international social organization